Bergen City Museum is a foundation which operates several museums in Bergen, Norway.

History
The museum foundation was established on 1 July 2005 through  merger of the former independent institutions.  The establishment of Bergen City Museum took place as part of a national museum reform.  Each  museum has joint administration and manages historic building reflecting  various aspects of the city's  history. Collectively Bergen City Museum presently manages more than 100 buildings and a unique collection of art and artifacts.

Subordinate museums
 Alvøen Manor (Alvøen hovedbygning)
 Bergen School Museum and Holberg Museum (Bergen Skolemuseum og Holbergmuseet)
 Bryggens Museum
 Damsgård Manor (Damsgård hovedgård)
 Håkon's Hall (Håkonshallen) 
 Hordaland Open-air Museum (Hordamuseet)
 Leprosy Museum at St. Jørgen Hospital (Lepramuseet) 
 Old Bergen Museum (Gamle Bergen museum)
 Rosenkrantz Tower (Rosenkrantztårnet)

Gallery

References

External links
 Official website

Museums in Bergen
Local museums in Norway
City museums in Norway
Organisations based in Bergen
Foundations based in Norway
2005 establishments in Norway